The men's slalom at the 2017 Asian Winter Games was held on 25 February 2017 at the Sapporo Teine, Japan.

Schedule
All times are Japan Standard Time (UTC+09:00)

Results
Legend
DNF — Did not finish
DNS — Did not start
DSQ — Disqualified

References

Results

External links
Official website

Men slalom